Jeremy Avigad is a professor of philosophy at Carnegie Mellon University.

He received a B.A. in mathematics from Harvard University in 1989, and a Ph.D. in mathematics from the University of California at Berkeley in 1995 under the supervision of Jack Silver.  He has contributed to the areas of mathematical logic and foundations, formal verification and interactive theorem proving, and the philosophy and history of mathematics. He became Director of the Hoskinson Center for Formal Mathematics at Carnegie Mellon University after Charles Hoskinson donated $20 Million in September 2021 to establish it.

References 

20th-century American mathematicians
21st-century American mathematicians
American logicians
Living people
Philosophers of mathematics
Carnegie Mellon University faculty
Harvard College alumni
1968 births
UC Berkeley College of Letters and Science alumni